The Sonate pour hautbois et piano de Poulenc (Oboe Sonata) FP 185, for oboe and piano by Francis Poulenc dates from 1962. It is dedicated to the memory of Sergei Prokofiev. According to many, the last movement, "Déploration," is the last piece Poulenc wrote before he died. It sits as a kind of obituary.

Music 
The Oboe Sonata is very difficult in places, especially the Scherzo. The sorrowful Déploration also requires great skill. To express his mourning for his friend Prokofiev, Poulenc uses the extremes of the oboe. For example, in one passage the player must play a phrase at the bottom of the oboe's range including B flat, the oboe's lowest note, very loudly (fortissimo). The same phrase is then repeated but is marked to be played very quietly (pianissimo). Another obvious example of Poulenc's use of extreme scoring in the first movement is the starting theme which is very high and the player must be skilled to control the notes and keep them in tune.

The piece is in three movements:

Elégie (Paisiblement, Sans Presser)
Scherzo (Très animé)
Déploration (Très calme)

The movements are in the order slow-fast-slow as opposed to the fast-slow-fast of the traditional sonata.

A typical performance will last between 13 and 15 minutes.

The sonata is the last of Poulenc's three sonatas for wind instruments and piano, the others being the Flute Sonata (1956) and the Clarinet Sonata (1962). Just after World War I he wrote a few other wind sonatas as well, for example a Sonata for two clarinets (FP 7a, 1918, revised 1945), a sonata for clarinet and bassoon (FP 32a. 1922, revised 1945), and a Sonata for horn, trumpet and trombone (FP 33a, 1922, revised 1945).

Poulenc's wind sonatas share similar thematic material. For example, motifs in the final movement of the Clarinet Sonata can be heard in the Scherzo of the Oboe Sonata. Similarly, the Second Movement of the Clarinet Sonata opens with a motif that can be seen as an inversion of the opening of the Elégie of the Oboe Sonata.

References

Bibliography

External links 

Compositions by Francis Poulenc
P
P
1962 compositions